The Bounty Hunter is a 2010 American action comedy film directed by Andy Tennant, starring Jennifer Aniston and Gerard Butler. The story centres on a bounty hunter hired to retrieve his ex-wife, who has skipped bail. The film was released in the United States on March 19, 2010. The film was panned by critics but was a box office success, grossing $136.3 million against a production budget of $40–45 million.

Plot
Milo Boyd, a former New York Police Department detective is now a bounty hunter.  His ex-wife, Nicole Hurley, is an investigative reporter who has been arrested for assaulting a police officer.

Nicole receives a tip on a story, an apparent suicide that may have been a murder, she skips her bond hearing to meet her informant, causing the judge to revoke her bail and issue a warrant for her arrest. Just before Nicole arrives, her informant, Jimmy is kidnapped.

Milo is ecstatic when Nicole's bail bondsman, Sid, offers him the job of bringing her to jail, for a bounty of $5,000. Nicole's mother Kitty inadvertently helps him find her at a race track in New Jersey. He throws her into his trunk and drives back towards Manhattan. Nicole escapes briefly before he catches up with her.

They are being stalked: Milo by two thugs sent by his bookie Irene, because of his gambling debts, Nicole by corrupt cop Earl Mahler, who is connected with the story she is investigating, and both by Nicole's lovestruck coworker Stewart, bent on rescuing her from Milo. Irene's thugs confuse Stewart for Milo and mistakenly kidnap him.

Earl tries to kill Nicole, but both Milo and Nicole narrowly escape. Milo is not interested in explanations until she tells him she's found evidence that implicates their mutual friend and Milo's ex-partner on the force, Bobby, indicating that he is involved with Earl. Milo decides to investigate with her.

Clues from Earl's car lead them to a country club, where they learn from a caddie that Earl owns a tattoo parlor in Queens, so they start to make their way there. Bobby warns them to stay off the road.

The nearest hotel is the bed and breakfast where they spent their honeymoon. They discover they still have feelings for each other and admit their mistakes. Coming out of the bathroom, Nicole overhears Milo telling Sid he may sleep with her, but he's still taking her to jail. She handcuffs him to the bed and goes to the tattoo parlor, finding Jimmy and freeing him before being captured by Irene's thugs.

Milo rescues Nicole at a strip club. Then, they hear Bobby is heading to the police's evidence warehouse, which is being relocated to a new building. Bobby confronts Earl, a former friend who has used Bobby's name to gain access to the warehouse and steal a large amount of narcotics and cash. Bobby decides to arrest him, but Earl shoots him. Milo and Nicole enter the warehouse and Milo is ambushed, but Earl surrenders when Nicole points a shotgun at him.

Bobby explains Earl was using him, as well as the man who supposedly committed suicide, to gain access to the warehouse. There was no proof, so Bobby was waiting for Earl to make his move before arresting him. Milo proudly notes that Earl might have gotten away with it if Nicole hadn't picked up clues. He and Nicole appear to have reconciled. They concede that sometimes their jobs have to come first. Milo turns Nicole in to the police, so she can make her court hearing the next day.

On his way out of the precinct, Milo runs into a cop who insulted him earlier and punches him in the face. He is arrested and put in the cell next to Nicole's. He reminds her that it is their anniversary and they have to spend it together. Through the bars they admit their love and kiss.

Cast
 Jennifer Aniston as Nicole Hurley (previously Boyd), a Daily News reporter, and Milo's ex-wife.
 Gerard Butler as Milo Boyd, a bounty hunter, former police officer, and Nicole's ex-husband.
 Jason Sudeikis as Stewart, Nicole's co-worker who has unrequited feelings for her.
 Jeff Garlin as Sid, Milo's friend, and employer as a bail bondsman.
 Cathy Moriarty as Irene, a gift shop owner, and local bookmaker.
 Ritchie Coster as Ray, one of Irene's employees.
 Joel Marsh Garland as Dwight, one of Irene's employees.
 Siobhan Fallon Hogan as Teresa, the secretary of Sid's business.
 Peter Greene as Earl Mahler, a corrupt cop.
 Dorian Missick as Bobby Jenkins, NYPD detective and Milo's best friend.
 Carol Kane as Dawn, a co-owner of a bed and breakfast.
 Adam LeFevre as Edmund, a co-owner of a bed and breakfast.
 Adam Rose as Jimmy, a bartender.
 Christine Baranski as Kitty Hurley, Nicole's mother.
 Matt Malloy as Gary, a co-worker of Nicole's.
 Christian Borle as Caddie.

Production
In May 2007, it was announced Columbia acquired the then untitled bounty hunter pitch for Development with Original Film.

Release

Box office
The Bounty Hunter was released alongside Repo Men and Diary of a Wimpy Kid. It grossed $20.7 million in its opening weekend. As of July 5, 2010 it has grossed $67,061,228 in North America and $69,031,265 internationally for a worldwide total of $136,333,522.

Critical response 
 On review aggregator website Rotten Tomatoes, the film has an approval rating of 12%, based on 150 reviews, and an average rating of 3.60/10. The site's critical consensus reads, "Gerard Butler and Jennifer Aniston remain as attractive as ever, but The Bounty Hunters formula script doesn't know what to do with them – or the audience's attention." On Metacritic, the film has a score of 22 out of 100, based on 31 critics, indicating "generally unfavorable reviews". Audiences polled by CinemaScore gave the film an average grade of "B−" on an A+ to F scale.

Roger Ebert gave the film one-and-a-half stars out of four, commenting that "neither [Aniston nor Butler] is allowed to speak more than efficient sentences to advance the plot" and that it is rife with "exhausted action clichés." A.O. Scott of The New York Times gave the film a completely negative review and said it was rated PG-13 for "witless sexual innuendo and witless violence." Kerry Lengel of The Arizona Republic gave the film three and a half stars out of five: "As formula films go, The Bounty Hunter is more enjoyable than most, even if it packs in as many clichés as any." However, Lengel did praise Aniston's and Butler's performances, but was critical of the "improbable" plot.

Accolades

Home media
The Bounty Hunter was released on DVD and Blu-ray Disc on July 13, 2010. The only extra material is three featurettes ("Making The Bounty Hunter", "Rules for Outwitting a Bounty Hunter", and "Stops Along the Road: Hunting Locations"). The film grossed $23,310,266 from DVD sales in North America.

References

External links
 
 
 
 
 

2010 films
2010 action comedy films
2010 crime action films
2010 romantic comedy films
2010s comedy road movies
2010s crime comedy films
2010s English-language films
2010s romantic action films
American action comedy films
American comedy road movies
American crime action films
American crime comedy films
American romantic action films
American romantic comedy films
Columbia Pictures films
Films about journalists
Films directed by Andy Tennant
Films produced by Neal H. Moritz
Films scored by George Fenton
Films set in Brooklyn
Films set in New Jersey
Films shot in Atlantic City, New Jersey
Films shot in New York City
Original Film films
Relativity Media films
Romantic crime films
Works about bounty hunters
2010s American films